MICROMORT is a computer program (by Heisey and Fuller, 1985) used to estimate mortality rates, commonly used in ecological studies.

References

Further reading
 Williams, B. K.; J. D. Nichols, M. J. Conroy. (2002). Analysis and management of animal populations. Academic Press

Population ecology
1985 software